The Kazakhstan women's national volleyball team represents Kazakhstan in international volleyball competitions. The team qualified for the 2008 Summer Olympics by ending up in fifth place at the Olympic Qualifier in Japan.

Results

Olympic Games
 2008 — 9th place
 2012 – did not qualify
 2016 – did not qualify
 2020 – did not qualify

World Championship
 2006 — 17th place
 2010 — 21st place
 2014 — 15th place
 2018 — 24th place
 2022 — 23rd place

World Grand Prix
 2007 — 10th place
 2008 — 12th place
 2011 — 15th place
 2013 — 17th place
 2014  —  24th place
 2015 —  26th place
 2016 —  22nd place
 2017 —  24th place

Challenger Cup
 2018 — withdrew
 2019 — did not enter
 2022 — 7th place

Asian Championship
 1993 — 5th place
 1999 — 9th place
 2003 — 7th place
 2005 —  Silver Medal
 2007 — 5th place
 2009 — 5th place
 2011 — 9th place
 2013 — 5th place
 2015 — 7th place
 2017 — 7th place
 2019 — 5th place

Asian Games
 1998 — 6th place
 2002 — 6th place
 2006 — 6th place
 2010 —  Bronze Medal
 2014 — 6th place
 2018 — 5th place

Asian Cup
 2010  — 5th place
 2012  —  Bronze Medal
 2014  —  Bronze Medal
 2016  —  Silver Medal
 2018  — 10th place
 2022 — Withdrew

Current squad
The following is the Kazakhstan roster in the 2018 World Championship.

Head coach: Darko Dobreskov

References

External links
Official website
FIVB profile

Volleyball
National women's volleyball teams
Volleyball in Kazakhstan